Jana Smidakova (born 6 November 1983) is a Czech-born, Spanish sprint canoeist who has competed since the mid-2000s. She won five medals at the ICF Canoe Sprint World Championships with two silvers (K-2 200 m: 2005, K-4 200 m: 2003) and three bronzes (K-4 200 m: 2005, K-4 500 m: 2003, 2009)

Smidakova also competed in two Summer Olympics, earning her best finish of fifth on two occasions (2004: K-4 500 m, 2008: K-4 500 m).

References
Canoe09.ca profile 

Sports-reference.com profile

1983 births
Canoeists at the 2004 Summer Olympics
Canoeists at the 2008 Summer Olympics
Spanish people of Czech descent
People from Asturias
Czech female canoeists
Living people
Olympic canoeists of Spain
Spanish female canoeists
ICF Canoe Sprint World Championships medalists in kayak